Diogo Correa de Oliveira, or simply Diogo (8 April 1983 – 9 June 2021), was a Brazilian professional footballer who played as a forward for clubs in countries like Brazil, Sweden, Japan and Libya.

Death 
Diogo died on 9 June 2021, when his motorcycle collided with a lamppost in Maringá, Paraná state, Brazil. He died due to injuries sustained to his head.

References

External links

1983 births
2021 deaths
Brazilian footballers
Association football midfielders
Allsvenskan players
J2 League players
América Futebol Clube (RN) players
CR Flamengo footballers
Hokkaido Consadole Sapporo players
Tokushima Vortis players
Kalmar FF players
IFK Norrköping players
Adap Galo Maringá Football Club players
ABC Futebol Clube players
Brasiliense Futebol Clube players
Horizonte Futebol Clube players
Brazilian expatriate footballers
Brazilian expatriate sportspeople in Sweden
Expatriate footballers in Sweden
Brazilian expatriate sportspeople in Libya
Expatriate footballers in Libya
Brazilian expatriate sportspeople in Japan
Expatriate footballers in Japan
People from São Bernardo do Campo
Road incident deaths in Brazil
Footballers from São Paulo (state)